Kalapachandra Dvija was medieval litterateur from Kamrup
"Ramayana Chandrika" was one of his notable work.

See also
 Vishnu Bharati
 Sarvabhauma Bhattacharya

References

Kamrupi literary figures
Kamrupi people